Dubicsány is a village in Borsod-Abaúj-Zemplén County, in Hungary.

Etymology
The name comes from Slavic/Slovak Dubica, Dubičany (a place name derived from dub: oak) → Dubicsány.  Dabachanyw (1347), Dubicha (1401).

References

Populated places in Borsod-Abaúj-Zemplén County